Pitipong Kuldilok is a Thai former football player.

Honours

 SEA Games Winner

2003 - Thailand

Thai FA Cup Winner

2009 - Thai Port FC

International goals

References

External links

1980 births
Living people
Pitipong Kuldilok
Pitipong Kuldilok
Pitipong Kuldilok
Expatriate footballers in Singapore
Sembawang Rangers FC players
Geylang International FC players
Singapore Premier League players
Association football forwards
Pitipong Kuldilok
Pitipong Kuldilok